U22: A 22 Track Live Collection from U2360° is a live album released by the Irish rock band U2 in May 2012 only available to u2.com subscribers. The 22 tracks were voted for by subscribers to U2.com.

Track listing

References

U2 live albums
2012 live albums
Self-released albums